Anna Dierking (born August 12, 1986 in Fürth in Bavaria) is a Luxembourgish figure skater. She is the 2003 & 2004 Luxembourgish national champion and is the first female figure skater to represent Luxembourg at the European and World Figure Skating Championships. Her highest placement at an ISU Championship is 20th at the 2004 European Figure Skating Championships. She is married with Robert Dierking.

Competitive highlights 

 J = Junior level; QR = Qualifying round; WD = Withdrawn

References

External links 
 Tracings.net profile

Luxembourgian figure skaters
1986 births
Living people
Sportspeople from Fürth
Luxembourgian sportswomen